Enrico Augusto Delle Sedie (17 June 1824 – 28 November 1907) was an Italian operatic baritone who sang extensively in Europe, performing the bel canto repertoire and in works by Verdi.

Early life
He was born in Livorno and studied with Cesario Galeffi.

Career
After retiring from the stage, he taught at the Paris Conservatory from 1876 to 1886 and later privately. The renowned lyric tenor Alessandro Bonci was one of his pupils. "Although his voice was small, his style and musicianship were regarded as outstanding".

Bibliography
Delle Sedie wrote two treatises on singing (1876, 1886) as well as the book Riflessioni sulle cause della decadenza della scuola di canto in Italia (Reflections on the decline of the School of Singing in Italy) (Paris, 1881).

Legacy
A street in Livorno, the city of his birth, is named after him.

References

External links
Fondo Enrico delle Sedie (Provincia di Livorno)
 Enrico Delle Sedie – Una Voce Ritrovata (ref)
 Dizionario Biografico degli Italiani by A. Iesur
Images
Delle Sedie as Figaro (ref)
Photos Gallica
Books and Writings
 
How to learn to sing (Article contribution to Modern music and musicians for vocalists)
Publications at University of Rochester

L'Art lyrique, Traité complet de chant et de déclamation lyrique Enrico Delle Sedie (Paris, 1847)
Arte e Fisiologia del Canto Enrico Delle Sedie (1876)
Riflessioni sulle cause della decadenza della scuola di canto in Italia Enrico Delle Sedie (1881)

1822 births
1907 deaths
Italian operatic baritones
19th-century Italian male opera singers
Academic staff of the Conservatoire de Paris
Voice teachers
People from Livorno